State Route 240 (SR 240) is a primary state highway in the U.S. state of Virginia. The state highway runs  between junctions with U.S. Route 250 (US 250) in Brownsville and near Ivy. SR 240 is an L-shaped route that forms the old alignment of US 250 through Crozet in western Albemarle County.

Route description

SR 240 begins at an intersection with US 250 (Rockfish Gap Turnpike) in Brownsville. The state highway heads north as two-lane undivided Crozet Avenue into the unincorporated town of Crozet. SR 240 passes under CSX's North Mountain Subdivision and immediately reaches a four-way intersection with SR 788 (Railroad Avenue) and SR 810, on which Crozet Avenue continues north. SR 240 turns east onto Three Notchd Road. The state highway closely parallels the railroad for a short distance, then veers away and does not approach the rail line again until its eastern terminus at US 250 just west of the Mechums River west of Ivy. US 250 heads southwest as Rockfish Gap Turnpike and east as Ivy Road toward Charlottesville.

Major intersections

References

External links

Virginia Highways Project: VA 240

240
State Route 240